Modicarventus wisei is an endemic species of New Zealand flat bug, described by Kirman in 1989. The specimens were first collected from Unuwhao on the North Cape in February 1967 by K.A.J. Wise, but not described as a new species until 1989.

The species are of 2–3 mm in length, with a red-brown colouration. The species appears to be related to Neocarventus angulatus due to both species sharing similar thorax characteristics. Modicarventus wisei was named after New Zealand entomologist K.A.J. Wise.

References

Aradidae
Insects described in 1989
Hemiptera of New Zealand
Pentatomomorpha genera
Monotypic Hemiptera genera